Goat Story - The Old Prague Legends is a 2008 Czech 3D computer-animated fantasy comedy film produced and directed by Jan Tománek, and written by Tománek with David Sláma. The first Czech-produced feature-length computer-animated film, it features animation by Art And Animation studios and was released May 19, 2010 in the United States.

The film features the voices of Jiří Lábus, Matěj Hádek, Mahulena Bočanová, Michal Dlouhý, Petr Pelzer, Jan Přeučil, Viktor Preiss, Miroslav Táborský, Karel Heřmánek, Petr Nárožný, Dalimil Klapka, Pavel Rímský, Ota Jirák, Filip Jevič and Justin Svoboda. Produced over the course of five years with a budget of $1.8 million, only about ten animators and 3D graphic designers worked on it.

Goat Story was released in theatres on October 16, 2008 by Bontonfilm. It won the main prize at the 2010 Buenos Aires International Children's Film Festival, and received nominations at other film festivals. A sequel, Goat Story 2, was released in 2012.

Plot
The story takes place in Prague during the reign of Charles IV, when the Charles Bridge and Prague Astronomical Clock were still under construction a villager named Jemmy comes to the capital from the countryside with his Goat. Jemmy and Koza stay in Prague to work on the bridge. It is here that Jemmy sees Katie for the first time and immediately falls in love with her. Katie is a city girl who supplies forged nails for the construction of the bridge. Jemmy ends up causing the scaffolding on one side of the bridge to fall because he was carving a statue of Katie from one of the support beams, he and his goat are expelled by the workers. Meanwhile, Master Hanuš is looking for sculptors and carvers for the Astronomical Clock statues, he spots Jemmy and is interested with his natural woodcarving talent. Matthew, who is the target of ridicule by other students due to his poverty, also studies with Master Hanuš. He has gained the trust of his teacher and is overseeing the plans of the Astronomical Clock. Because Matthew has nowhere to sleep, he finds the Faust House in Prague, already abandoned at the time. Thanks to his classmates' constant ridicule, he succumbs to the lure and picks up a silver tolar in Faust's house to pay for his classmates' drinks and fit in with his peers. However, they deceive him and destroy the plans to the Astronomical Clock while they're unguarded. The unsuspecting Matthew hands the ruined plans back to Master Hanuš. The Prague councilors discover the damaged plans and demand punishment of the culprit. Matthew is put in a pillory for a day and because he does not know what he did wrong, he decides to avenge Hanuš. When Master Hanuš and Jemmy complete the Astronomical Clock, they get no respect or recognition. The Chinese offer Master Hanuš to build an astronomical clock in their city as well. Matthew witnesses this discussion, who in the meantime signed his contract with the Devil, he writes a letter to Prague councilors telling them that Hanus is a traitor. He entrusts the executioner of Mydlář to cut Hanuš's eyes out. Hanuš wants to take revenge for this violence and ruins his own astronomical clock by sabotaging the gears. Jemmy, as his assistant, is commissioned to repair the astronomical clock under the threat of Katie being executed should he fail to do so in time. Jemmy fixes the astronomical clock at the last minute, but arrives at the gallows too late, Katie has already been hung. Jemmy is at a church praying for God to bring Katie back to him, it is at that moment that Katie enters the church. Later it is revealed that Jemmy's goat disguised herself as Katie and was hanged in her place. As the goat falls from the gallows, it is revealed that she had an iron tube in her throat the entire time, meaning her neck was never snapped and she survived the hanging.

Voice cast
 Jiří Lábus as Goat
 Matěj Hádek as Jemmy
 Mahulena Bočanová as Katie
 Michal Dlouhý as Matthew
 Petr Pelzer as Master Hanuš
 Jan Přeučil as Purkmistr
 Viktor Preiss as Konšel
 Miroslav Táborský as Priest Ignác
 Karel Heřmánek as Devil / Leader
 Petr Nárožný as Beggar
 Dalimil Klapka as Beggar
 Pavel Rímský as Beggar
 Ota Jirák as Taverner
 Filip Jevič as Student
 Justin Svoboda as Student
 Mike Buffo as Jemmy (English version)
 Luba Goy as Cořum (English version)
 Jo-Anne Krupa as Katie (English version)

Production

On 14 October 2001, it was announced that Jan Tománek was hired and set to direct, produce and write Goat Story - The Old Prague Legends. David Sláma co-wrote the script for the film. The film budget was just $1.8 million for release in 2008. On 5 June 2003, it was announced that Jiří Lábus, Matěj Hádek, Mahulena Bočanová, Michal Dlouhý, Petr Pelzer, Jan Přeučil, Viktor Preiss, Miroslav Táborský, Karel Heřmánek, Petr Nárožný, Dalimil Klapka, Pavel Rímský, Ota Jirák, Filip Jevič and Justin Svoboda joined the film.

Mike Buffo and Jo-Anne Krupa joined the cast on 9 July to voice Jemmy and Katy in the English version produced by Karl Hirsh. On 10 December 2005, it was announced that David Solař would compose the music for the film. Development, animation, lighting, color and storyboarding of the film was completed in Prague, Czech Republic. On 8 March 2007, Phase 4 Films and Bontonfilm acquired distribution rights to the film.

Release
Goat Story received a theatrical release on 16 October 2008 by Bontonfilm.

Marketing
The film was featured on the cover of the March 2008 edition of American publication Animation.

Home media
The film was released on DVD and Blu-ray on 10 April 2009 by Bontonfilm.

In 2015, the producers uploaded both Goat Story and its sequel on YouTube.

Reception

Box office
The film grossed $1.3 million in the Czech Republic. With admission 350.000 just in the Czech Republic it became the most successful Czech animated film ever.

Awards

Sequel

A sequel, Goat Story 2 was released in 2012.

See also
 List of animated feature films
 List of computer-animated films
 Prague Astronomical Clock

References

External links
 Official English website
 Official Czech website
 AAA Studio's YouTube channel
 Goat Story on YouTube for free
 
 

2008 films
2008 computer-animated films
Czech animated films
Films based on fairy tales
Czech animated comedy films
Czech animated fantasy films